Faisal Karim Kundi is a Pakistani politician currently serving as Minister of State Ministry of Poverty Alleviation and Social Safety Pakistan since September 2022 . He also holds the office of the Central Secretary Information of Pakistan Peoples Party and member of Central Executive Committee. Previously Mr. Kundi has served as the 17th Deputy Speaker of the National Assembly of Pakistan from 2008 to 2013.
Faisal Karim Kundi hails from a known political family of Khyber Pakhtunkhwa. He started his political career in 2003 and served PPP as Divisional Coordinator D.I.Khan Division.

Born in 1975 in Dera Ismail Khan and graduated from UK. He had an intrinsic inclination towards politics and was groomed by Late Benazir Bhutto during her stay in London. He contested election from NA-24 on PPP ticket in General Election of February 2008 and was elected as the 17th Deputy Speaker of the National Assembly of Pakistan on Wednesday March 19, 2008. He secured 246 votes out of 318 polled.

He has the honour of being the youngest Deputy Speaker from amongst so far elected Deputy Speakers.

Political career
His Grandfather and Father were very close to Zulfikar Ali Bhutto and Benazir Bhutto and were PPP Loyalists.
His father Fazal Karim Kundi was elected as MNA in 1990 on PPP ticket, and remained Chairman District Council D.I.Khan for two consecutive terms i.e. from 1983 to 1991.

His maternal grand father Justice (R) Faizullah Khan Kundi was also a member of the West Pakistan Assembly in 1960s. His maternal grandfather served as Senior Judge of Peshawar High Court in sixty's, Federal Minister for Establishment in the PPP government of Shaheed Zulfiqar Ali Bhutto in 1971-72 and later as Chairman Federal Public Service Commission (FPSC) from 1972 to 1979.

Faisal Karim Kundi's great grandfather Barrister Abdul Rahim Kundi has the distinction of being the first Deputy Speaker of the Khyber Pakhtunkhwa Legislative Assembly from 1932 to 1937.
He ran for the seat of the National Assembly of Pakistan from NA-24 (D.I.Khan) as a candidate of Pakistan Peoples Party in 2002 Pakistani general election but was unsuccessful.

He was elected to the National Assembly from NA-24 (D.I.Khan) as a candidate of Pakistan Peoples Party in 2008 Pakistani general election. In March 2008, he was made Deputy Speaker of the National Assembly.

He ran for the seat of the National Assembly of Pakistan from NA-24 (D.I.Khan) as an independent candidate in 2013 Pakistani general election but was unsuccessful.

In September 2022, Mr. Faisal Karim Kundi was appointed by the Prime Minister of Pakistan Mr. Shehbaz Sharif as the Special Assistant to the Prime Minister (SAPM) on Poverty Alleviation and Social Safety. Mr. Faisal Karim Kundi is also holding the political office at the Pakistan Peoples Party (PPP) serving as the Information Secretary of the PPP.

References 

Living people
Saraiki people
People from Dera Ismail Khan District
Deputy Speakers of the National Assembly of Pakistan
Pakistani MNAs 2008–2013
Year of birth missing (living people)